The battle of Khankala happened on 17 February 1807. In this action, the Khankala fortification was taken by storm. Russian forces entered Chechnya from three directions under the command of General of Infantry S. A. Bulgakov. The purpose of the expedition was to establish control over the strategically important Khankala Gorge.

Background 
Not a single Russian expedition in the Caucasus in 1804—1806 was so numerous. At the beginning of 1807, the commander-in-chief of the troops in Georgia and Dagestan, Count Major General I.V. Gudovich, ordered the commander of the troops on the Caucasian Line, Infantry General S.A. «intimidation» and «punishment» for raids and robberies.

Assault on the Khankala fortification 

On 13 February 1807, troops invaded Chechnya. The detachment of General Bulgakov could only penetrate the territory of Greater Chechnya by passing the Khankala Gorge, known to the line Cossacks as the Iron Gates. At that time, about twenty Chechen farms and auls were located in the vicinity of the Khankala Gorge.

On the 15th, the troops moved forward, almost to the very edge of the Khankala forest and camped opposite the village of Yangi-Yurt. The Chechens were waiting for the approach of the Russians, and as soon as they appeared, frequent rifle shots rained down from the forest. The whole day there was a shootout, at dusk crowds of Chechens rushed into hand-to-hand combat, but the Nizhny Novgorod dragoons under the command of Colonel K. F. Stal successfully beat them off.

By the time the troops approached, the Chechens had heavily fortified the gorge, creating rows of blockages, ditches and fences. "In the middle of the dense forest of plane trees, in the depths of the gorge, the Chechens took a terrible, almost impregnable position. It was covered from the front by a whole series of blockages, surrounded by ditches and moats; even further went log cabins, dotted with loopholes.

On the morning of the 17th, troops entered the protected forest in three columns. Nizhny Novgorod, dismounted, who sent their horses to Wegenburg, were distributed among all three columns, but most of them were concentrated in the left column, commanded by K. F. Stal. The Chechens greeted the attackers with a wild cry, and the whole forest trembled from the mixed sounds of the fierce battle that immediately began. Continuous shooting, hand-to-hand fighting, knocking, yaw of shying Cossack horses, crackling of trees, Bulgakov says in his report, made up a very striking picture for the eyes and ears and gave rise to extraordinary feelings. The attackers seemed to be in a fiery club. Slowly, step by step, the troops moved forward, showered with bullets from the front, turning their guns now to the right, then to the left to repel the Chechens, who attacked them furiously from the flanks. But following this bloody path, the soldiers took notch after notch, blockage after blockage, blockhouse after blockhouse. Stal’s left column found the obstacles almost insurmountable. Knocked out of some trenches and spotted, the enemy took cover behind the stone bends of the gorge, fortified again, and again struck the attackers. The Chechens defended themselves desperately, giving, as Bulgakov put it, a pretext for the attackers to declare countless feats.

Military historian P. M. Sakhno-Ustimovich wrote:

The battle went on for seven hours. Finally, the detachment made its way through the forest and went to the other side of the gorge. But three more hours of heroic efforts were needed from the army for the final defeat of the enemy. Highlanders overturned at all points, retreated.

Losses 
As a result of a bloody battle, the Russians managed to break through the gorge. In various reports of I.V. Gudovich, Russian losses are called in the amount of 51 to 63 killed with 111 wounded, however, artillery officer Brimmer estimated Russian losses at about a thousand people.

Effects 

As a result of a stubborn 10-hour assault, accompanied by heavy losses on the part of the Russian army, the Khankala fortification was occupied by the 16th Jaeger Regiment, commanded by General P. G. Likhachev, later the hero of the Battle of Borodino. The commander of the Nizhny Novgorod Dragoon Regiment K. F. Stal was promoted to major general, subsequently appointed commander of the troops of the Caucasian cordon line, governor of the Caucasus region.

См. также 
 Battle of the Sunja

References

Further reading 
 The Russian conquest of the Caucasus, John Frederick Baddeley, 1908
 Gapurov Sh. A., Akhmadov Sh. B., Bagaev M. Kh., Khasbulatov A. I. The history of Chechnya from ancient times to the present day / leader Ibragimov M. M .. — Gr .: State Unitary Enterprise «Book Publishing House», 2008 . — T. 1. — 827 p. — ISBN 978-5-98896-103-1.
 Арсанукаева Малика Султановна. Русско-Чеченские соглашения 1807 года.: политико-правовой аспект // Право и государство: теория и практика. — 2009. — Вып. 8 (56). — .
 Бриммэр Э. В. Служба артиллерийского офицера, воспитывавшегося в I кадетском корпусе и выпущенного в 1815 году // Кавказский сборник, Том 16. 1895.
 Лачинов Е. Е. Отрывок из «Исповедни» Лачинова // Кавказский сборник, Том 2. 1877
 Дебу И. Л. О Кавказской линии к присоединённом к ней Черноморском войске или Общие замечания о поселённых полках, ограждающих Кавказскую линию, и о соседственных горских народах. С 1816 по 1826 год / Ценсор В. Г. Анастасевич. — СПб.: Тип. Карла Крайя, 1829. — 504 с.

External links 
 ESBE/Khankala Gorge
 Campaign in the North Caucasus in 1807
 Latsinsky A. C. Chronology of Russian military history. Chronological index of wars, battles and deeds in which Russian troops took part from Peter I to modern times.
 Dubrovin N. F. History of war and domination of Russians in the Caucasus.
 Zubov P. P. The exploits of Russian soldiers in the Caucasian countries from 1800 to 1834.
 Fadeev R. A "60 years of the Caucasian war

Caucasian War
Battles involving Chechnya
Battles involving Russia